Panic at Rock Island is a 2011 Australian-New Zealand TV movie made for the Syfy (Australia) Channel.

Cast
 Zoe Crammond
 Vince Colosimo
 Sarah Tasik

Production
The film was made with financial support from Channel Nine and Universal Networks International (UNI). UNI purchased the film at the development stage purely on the basis of the storyline.

The film was shot over four weeks on Goat Island and in Balmain, Sydney.

"It’s our passion and drive to return to these bigger and higher concept stories which tend to be shyed away from due to budget concerns,” said director Tony Tilse. “Australian telemovies need to present something good and this [Panic at Rock Island] is a bolder concept than what has ever been done before.”

References

External links
 Panic at Rock Island at IMDb
 Review at NZ Herald

Australian television films
New Zealand television films
Films directed by Tony Tilse